The Nokia 5310 (2020) is a Nokia-branded feature phone developed by HMD Global. It was announced on 19 March 2020 alongside the Nokia 1.3, Nokia 5.3 and Nokia 8.3 5G as a revival of the original Nokia 5310 produced circa 2007.

Design and function
The 5310 functions primarily as a media-player with FM-radio, an MP3-player, support for Bluetooth 3.0 and front-facing stereo-speakers. A 3.5mm audio jack is also present, and dedicated music buttons are located on the side. The phone has a 2.4" QVGA resolution display. On the rear, there is a VGA camera accompanied by an LED-flash. Internal storage is limited to 16MB, but can be expanded up to 32GB via a microSD card slot. The battery is rated at 1200 mAh and can provide 7.5 hours of talk time; standby ranges from 30 days for single-SIM and 22 days for dual-SIM. The device only supports dual-band 2G.

The design is styled after the original 5310 with the same color-schemes, Black and Red, and White and Red.

References

5310
Nokia phones by series
Mobile phones introduced in 2020
Mobile phones with user-replaceable battery